Jantsch is a surname. Notable people with the surname include:

Carol Jantsch (born 1985), American classical tubist
Erich Jantsch (1929–1980), Austrian-born American astrophysicist, engineer, educator, writer, consultant and futurist
John Jantsch (born 1960), American writer, speaker and business consultant